Flumserberg is a resort area in the Swiss Alps, located in the canton of St. Gallen. The resort sits on a terrace overlooking the Walensee, above Flums in the Sarganserland region. Flumserberg mainly belongs to the municipality of Flums, with a small part belonging to the municipality of Quarten.

The three main villages composing the resort of Flumserberg are: Tannenbodenalp, Flumserberg and Tannenheim.

References
Swisstopo topographic maps

External links

Flumserberg.ch (official website)
Flumserberg on Wanderland.ch

Villages in the canton of St. Gallen
Ski areas and resorts in Switzerland